Nikolai Erastovich Berzarin (Russian: Никола́й Эра́стович Берза́рин; 1 April 1904 – 16 June 1945) was a Soviet officer in the Red Army during the Stalinist era and the Second World War. In 1945 he became the first town mayor of the Soviet occupying forces in Berlin.

Biography
Berzarin was born in Saint Petersburg as the son of a pipefitter  and a seamstress. He had one brother and four sisters. In 1925, he married bank employee Natalja Prosinjuk, with whom he had two daughters, Larissa and Irina.

Training
In 1918 Berzarin enlisted in the Red Army and fought against Allied troops in Archangelsk. Between 1921 and 1923 he received more military training at the Leningrad Command Courses, machine gun course at the "Vistrel" and a command course at the Siberian Military District. In 1922, he became a member of Komsomol. In 1923 he was assigned to Siberia.

In 1926, after officer training, he became a member of the CPSU.

Military career
He began service as an enlisted soldier in the Soviet Union in Petrograd, and after service on the Northern Front against the Allied Intervention also participated in the suppression of the Kronstadt Rebellion (1921). In 1924 he was serving as a junior officer in the Amur region against the bandit raiders. In 1927 he returned to Siberia, where he was an assistant to commander of an officers training unit in Irkutsk. From 1933 to 1935, he served in the staff of the Special Red Banner Far Eastern Army; from 1935 to 1937 he led the 77th Rifle Regiment of the 26th Rifle Division of the Far Eastern Army. Until 1938, he was the chief instructor of the Amur group.

During the Great Purge, he was accused of owing his career to the "enemies of the people", but was supported by various Communist Party members. As commander of the 32nd Rifle Division, he repelled Japanese attacks at Lake Khasan (1938), for which he was awarded the Order of the Red Banner.

After his appointment as Major General, he was transferred at his own request to Riga, and became commander of the 27th Army in May 1941.

He fought against the German armed forces after their assault on the Soviet Union. From December 1941 to May 1944 he was Commander-in-Chief of several armies; he was badly wounded in March 1943 and was hospitalized for six months.

He received the Order of Lenin and was promoted to Colonel General for his success in breaking through German lines in the Second Jassy–Kishinev Offensive. After conquering Chișinău in August 1944, the Belorussian and Ukrainian Fronts began their march on Berlin.

Commander of Berlin

During the Battle of Berlin, Berzarin's 5th Shock Army reached the eastern outskirts of Berlin on 21 April 1945, making them the first Soviet Army to do so. On 24 April, he was appointed commander of the city by Marshal Zhukov, in an echo of the Tsarist tradition of rewarding the first commander to enter a city with command over it. By his "Order No. 1" on 28 April, Berzarin assumed all governmental power. He worked to re-establish order in the ruined German capital, creating a city police force and supplying the population with food, water, gas and electricity, as well as re-opening schools and theatres. Berzarin was responsible for the looting of many art treasures from Berlin, most notably those stored in the Zoo Tower. On 17 May, he appointed non-partisan Arthur Werner the first post-war Mayor of Berlin presiding over a civil city government.

On 16 June 1945, after only 55 days in office, he was killed in a motorcycle accident when he collided with a truck convoy near his office in Berlin-Friedrichsfelde, aged 41. Rumors that scattered Nazi Werwolf forces had assassinated him were never established. Berzarin is buried in the Novodevichy Cemetery in Moscow.

Awards and honours

Honorary citizenship

In 1975 Berzarin posthumously was bestowed honorary citizenship of East Berlin. After German reunification he was formally removed from the roll of honorary citizens by the Senate of Berlin in 1992.

Upon a resolution by the Berlin Abgeordnetenhaus parliament, he regained his honorary citizenship in 2003, in view of his merits concerning the supply of the local population. Detractors of the re-awarding claimed that Berzarin was a Stalinist and involved in Soviet war crimes being responsible for the deportation of 47,000 Balts in 1940. These accusations, however, were proven wrong later on, as Berzarin was deployed in Vladivostok at the questioned time.

From 1947 until 1991 Petersburger Straße in Berlin-Friedrichshain, a section of the Inner Ring Road, was named Bersarinstraße in his honour, the Bersarinplatz roundabout bears his name up to today. In April 2005, a road bridge in Berlin-Marzahn was named after Berzarin, in the area where his army reached the Berlin city limits in 1945. A birch tree planted in 2005 and a memorial stone mark the (presumed) site of his motorcycle accident.

See also

 Battle in Berlin

References

1904 births
1945 deaths
Military personnel from Saint Petersburg
Soviet colonel generals
Motorcycle road incident deaths
1945 road incidents
Road incident deaths in Germany
Heroes of the Soviet Union
Recipients of the Order of Lenin
Recipients of the Order of the Red Banner
Recipients of the Order of Suvorov, 1st class
Recipients of the Order of Kutuzov, 1st class
Recipients of the Order of Bogdan Khmelnitsky (Soviet Union), 1st class
Recipients of the Order of Suvorov, 2nd class